2012–13 season is the 11th Moldovan National Division season in the history of FC Dacia Chisinau.

Competitive games

Friendlies

Pre-season / First Half Season

Transfers and loans

Pre-season window

References 

FC Dacia seasons
Dacia